Shauntay L. Henderson (born October 18, 1982) is an American convicted felon. She was a wanted fugitive for murder apprehended on March 31, 2007 by the FBI after being on the run for months until put onto the FBI's Ten Most Wanted Fugitives list for less than 24 hours. A reward of $100,000 for information leading to her arrest was offered. She had a bench trial and the judge gave her parole with a 10 year suspended sentence, due to her being her own main witness in her trial and claiming self defense. 5 months later, while out on parole, she was pulled over and caught with narcotics and an illegal firearm leading to a 17 year sentence with a release date in 2027.

Biography
Henderson grew up in the Charlie Parker Square public housing project in Kansas City, Missouri.

Criminal history
Police have suspected Henderson was involved in as many as five other murders and a number of other shootings. However, no other charges have been filed.

Manslaughter
On September 2, 2006, Henderson shot and killed DeAndre Parker at a gas station in Kansas City, Missouri. Henderson claimed Parker was trying to run her over with his truck. A judge acquitted Henderson of murder charges but found her guilty of the lesser charge of voluntary manslaughter and armed criminal action.

The Kansas City Police Department claimed that Henderson was a leader of the violent 12 Street gang who associated with gangs from 24th street through 27th, 51st, and 57th Street. Their alliance was titled "512", "5 ace 2", or "5 ace deuce". However, the claims of the police were never substantiated. At trial, Henderson denied any involvement with gangs.

In May 2012, Henderson was sentenced to serve 10 years in prison for the 2006 manslaughter conviction for which she had previously been sentenced to probation. This sentence of 10 years will run consecutively to her seven-year federal sentence for the charge of being a felon in possession of a weapon so she will spend a total of 17 years in prison.

Felon in possession of a firearm
On October 27, 2011, Henderson pleaded guilty to felonious possession of a firearm. In April 2012, Henderson was sentenced to seven years in federal prison without parole. She was assigned BOP #05164-748 and served her sentence at the Federal Correctional Institution, Waseca.

After her release from federal prison, Henderson was sent to the Women's Eastern Reception, Diagnostic and Correctional Center in Vandalia, Missouri.

References

External links
The Internet Wayback Machine's archive of Henderson's FBI top ten most wanted poster
Henderson's profile on America's Most Wanted
Police catch fugitive Shauntay Henderson

1982 births
Living people
People from Kansas City, Missouri
Gang members
American female organized crime figures
American prisoners and detainees
Criminals from Missouri
American people convicted of manslaughter
People acquitted of murder